The 1979 USAC Championship Car season consisted of seven races, beginning in Ontario, California on March 25 and concluding in West Allis, Wisconsin on August 12.  The USAC National Champion was A. J. Foyt and the Indianapolis 500 winner was Rick Mears.  With the exception of the Indianapolis 500, most top drivers instead competed in races sanctioned by CART.

During the summer of 1979, after the California 500 switched alliances mid-season to become a CART series race, USAC proposed a Labor Day weekend race meet that would consist of a USAC Stock Car/Championship Car doubleheader at the Indianapolis Motor Speedway. A 250-mile stock car race on Saturday would be followed by a 250-mile Indy car race on Sunday. However, the plan never materialized.

Confirmed entries

Schedule and results

All races running on Oval/Speedway.

 Non-USAC drivers Originally scheduled as a USAC race, but was switched mid-season to a CART series race.

Final points standings

The CART drivers were not eligible for points.

See also
 1979 Indianapolis 500
 1979 SCCA/CART Indy Car Series

Footnotes

References

 
 
 http://media.indycar.com/pdf/2011/IICS_2011_Historical_Record_Book_INT6.pdf  (p. 212-213)

USAC Championship Car season
USAC Championship Car
1979 in American motorsport